Colleen Carney (born 23 January 1967) is an Australian former professional tennis player.

Carney, who grew up in Sydney, received a scholarship to the Australian Institute of Sport in 1983.

Active on tour in the 1980s, Carney was ranked amongst the world's top 200 players and featured in the qualifying draws of all four grand slam tournaments, reaching the main draw only at the 1984 Australian Open.

References

External links
 
 

1967 births
Living people
Australian female tennis players
Tennis players from Sydney
Australian Institute of Sport tennis players
20th-century Australian women